British Lions is the 1978 eponymous debut album by British Lions, the band consisting mainly of members of Mott—Morgan Fisher, Ray Major, Pete Overend Watts and Dale Griffin—alongside singer/guitarist John Fiddler, previously of Medicine Head. It was released on the Vertigo label in the UK and the RSO label in the United States. A single "One More Chance to Run" b/w "Booster" was released by Vertigo in the UK to promote the album.  In the US, the track, "Wild in the Streets" went to #87 on the Hot 100.

"One More Chance to Run" was covered by Joe Elliott's Down 'n' Outz on their 2010 album My ReGeneration.

Track listing
All tracks composed by John Fiddler, except where noted.

Personnel
British Lions
John Fiddler – lead vocals, rhythm guitar
Ray Major – lead guitar; backing vocals (tracks 1, 3, 6-8), percussion (track 3)
Morgan Fisher – piano, Hammond organ, Korg synthesizer, davolisint; slide glockenspiel and electric percussion (track 9)
Pete Watts – bass; backing vocals (tracks 1, 3, 6-8), slide guitar (track 1)
Dale "Buffin" Griffin – drums; backing vocals (tracks 2, 4, 5), percussion (track 3)
Additional personnel
Stan Tippins — backing vocals (tracks 2, 4)
Technical
Alan "Ghastly Toad" Douglas and Mick "School Bully" Glossop - recording
Alan Schmidt - art direction

References

1978 debut albums
Vertigo Records albums
RSO Records albums